KWIK (1240 AM) is a radio station broadcasting a news–talk format serving the Pocatello, Idaho, United States, area.  The station is currently owned by Rich Broadcasting and licensed to Rich Broadcasting Idaho LS, LLC.  The station features programming from Fox News Radio and Premiere Radio Networks.

Ownership
In October 2007, a deal was reached for KWIK to be acquired by GAP Broadcasting II LLC (Samuel Weller, president) from Clear Channel Communications as part of a 57 station deal with a total reported sale price of $74.78 million.  What eventually became GapWest Broadcasting was folded into Townsquare Media on August 13, 2010; Townsquare, in turn, sold its Idaho Falls–Pocatello stations to Rich Broadcasting in 2011.

References

External links

WIK
News and talk radio stations in the United States
Radio stations established in 1946
1946 establishments in Idaho